Group C of the EuroBasket Women 2017 took place between 16 and 19 June 2017. The group played all of its games at Prague, Czech Republic.

Standings

All times are local (UTC+2).

Matches

Serbia vs Greece

Slovenia vs France

Greece vs Slovenia

France vs Serbia

Serbia vs Slovenia

France vs Greece

External links
Official website

Group C
2016–17 in Serbian basketball
2016–17 in Greek basketball
2016–17 in French basketball
2016–17 in Slovenian basketball